Thomas Sewell Sr (5 May 1806 – 1 November 1888) was an English professional cricketer whose top-class career spanned the years 1830 to 1853. He was a right-handed batsman, occasional wicket-keeper and slow underarm bowler who was mainly associated with Surrey. He represented the Players in the Gentlemen v Players series and was an original member of William Clarke's All-England Eleven in 1846. His brother, William Sewell, played twice for Surrey, and his son, Tom Sewell Jr, played for Surrey and the All-England Eleven.

References

1806 births
1888 deaths
English cricketers of 1826 to 1863
English cricketers
Fast v Slow cricketers
Kent cricketers
Married v Single cricketers
Marylebone Cricket Club cricketers
Middlesex cricketers
Players cricketers
Surrey Club cricketers
Surrey cricketers